Lam Ka Wai (born 5 June 1985 in Hong Kong) is a Hong Kong professional footballer who currently plays for Hong Kong Premier League club Rangers.

Lam is an AFC B License holder.

Club career

Early career
Lam Ka Wai lived away from his parents and spent his childhood years playing football. During his school life, he had showed his talent in soccer. He could complete with high school teammate while aged 15. He was studying in Concordia Lutheran School and after Form 3 he ceased his studies to pursue a football career.

He started his football career at Yee Hope's youth academy. In 2002 he joined Rangers but was loaned to Double Flower on a monthly salary of just HKD$1,500 , to train under coach Chiu Chung Man. He was then loaned further to Kitchee when he was just 17.

In 2004, he returned to Rangers and began to impress. He was selected for the Hong Kong national team in 2005 and scored on his debut. Unfortunately, he suffered a severe ankle ligament injury in 2005 and was sidelined for most of the league season.

Kitchee
Lam joined Kitchee in 2008 and along with Lo Kwan Yee has been the mainstay of the club since. At Kitchee he plays as the midfield playmaker, wearing the no. 10 shirt.

In June 2010, Kitchee reported to the Hong Kong Football Association that Fourway Rangers made an illegal approach for his services.

On 29 July 2013, Lam Ka Wai played against Manchester United. He dribbled pass Manchester United star midfielder Michael Carrick before unleashing a wonder shot pass Ben Amos. He also gave an assist to Alex that tore open Manchester United's defence.

2010–11 season
In the 2010-11 Hong Kong First Division League season, he scored 9 goals and was a key member of the team that overcame South China AA by one point to win the league title. This was the first title for Kitchee in 47 years, gaining the club the rights to play in the 2011 Barclays Asia Trophy and 2012 AFC Cup.

Lam Ka Wai's contribution included two goals against South China on 11 December 2010 to help Kitchee claim an important 4:3 away win. He scored two more in the 7:0 victory over Tai Chung FC on 1 May 2011.

Fibula fracture
After the season ended, Lam Ka Wai played in a local soccer game without Kitchee's consent and fractured his fibula, making him unable to play for either Hong Kong in the 2014 FIFA World Cup Asian qualification matches or for Kitchee in the 2011 Barclays Asia Trophy. For this reason, Kitchee stripped him of his vice captaincy.

2011–12 season
On 19 April 2012, Lam Ka Wai received the Most Valuable Player for March 2012 award from the Hong Kong Sport Press Association, after helping the club win the 2011-12 Hong Kong League Cup.

2013–14 season
On 29 July 2013, in an exhibition match against English Premier League giants Manchester United at the Hong Kong Stadium, Lam Ka Wai scored by curling the ball into the top corner from outside the box on 53 minutes, giving reserve United keeper Ben Amos no chance. But Kitchee lost the match 2–5.

2016-17 season
Lam scored a last minute winner versus Hà Nội on 25 January 2017 to lift Kitchee to victory in their 2017 AFC Champions League qualifying play-off match.

Eastern
After over a decade at Kitchee, Lam signed with fellow Hong Kong Premier League club Eastern on 1 July 2018.

R&F
On 13 January 2020, Lam terminated his contract with Eastern and signed with rivals R&F. The contract is for a half year, with a clause for an automatic extension after seven league appearances.

However, 2020 coronavirus outbreak in Hong Kong the 2019–20 season was suspended before he could trigger the extension. Thus, on 6 June 2020, Lam revealed that R&F had declined to renew his contract at the club.

Rangers
On 10 September 2020, Rangers' Director of Football Philip Lee declared that Lam would return to the club as a player and a youth team coach. He added that Lam would sign a one year contract and be given the captain's armband.

International career

Lam Ka Wai earned his first full international cap against Mongolia on 5 March 2005. On 1 June 2012, Lam Ka Wai scored the only goal in Hong Kong's friendly win against Singapore at the Hong Kong Stadium.

Honours
Kitchee
Hong Kong Premier League: 2014–15, 2016–17, 2017–18
Hong Kong First Division: 2010–11, 2011–12, 2013–14
Hong Kong Senior Shield: 2016–17
Hong Kong FA Cup: 2011–12, 2012–13, 2014–15, 2016–17, 2017–18
Hong Kong Sapling Cup: 2017–18
Hong Kong League Cup: 2011–12, 2014–15, 2015–16

Career statistics

Club
As of 6 December 2006

International

References

External links

Lam Ka Wai at HKFA
 
 

1985 births
Living people
Hong Kong footballers
Hong Kong international footballers
Association football midfielders
Hong Kong Rangers FC players
Double Flower FA players
Kitchee SC players
Eastern Sports Club footballers
R&F (Hong Kong) players
Hong Kong Premier League players
Footballers at the 2006 Asian Games
Footballers at the 2018 Asian Games
Asian Games competitors for Hong Kong